The 2010 Robert Morris Colonials football team represented Robert Morris University in the 2010 NCAA Division I FCS football season. The Colonials were led by 17th-year head coach Joe Walton and played their home games at Joe Walton Stadium. They are a member of the Northeast Conference.

Schedule

References

Robert Morris
Robert Morris Colonials football seasons
Northeast Conference football champion seasons
Robert Morris
Robert Morris Colonials football